The 2019 Japanese motorcycle Grand Prix was the sixteenth round of the 2019 MotoGP season. It was held at the Twin Ring Motegi in Motegi on 20 October 2019.

Classification

MotoGP

 Tito Rabat developed a vascular problem in his hand during practice and withdrew from the event.

Moto2

Moto3

Championship standings after the race

MotoGP

Moto2

Moto3

Notes

References

External links

Japan
Motorcycle Grand Prix
Japanese motorcycle Grand Prix
Japan motorcycle Grand Prix